Isachne meeboldii is a critically endangered species of herb endemic to open grasslands in Western Ghats of India. It has been reported from Shimoga and Kumsi in the state of Karnataka and Aurangabad in Maharashtra.

References

Micrairoideae
Endemic flora of India (region)
Grasses of India
Flora of Karnataka
Flora of Maharashtra
Flora of the Western Ghats
Critically endangered flora of Asia